The canton of Belleville-sur-Meuse is an administrative division of the Meuse department, northeastern France. It was created at the French canton reorganisation which came into effect in March 2015. Its seat is in Belleville-sur-Meuse. It includes the six "destroyed villages", which were depopulated in the Battle of Verdun during World War I.

It consists of the following communes:
 
Abaucourt-Hautecourt
Beaumont-en-Verdunois
Belleville-sur-Meuse
Bezonvaux
Blanzée
Bras-sur-Meuse
Champneuville
Charny-sur-Meuse
Châtillon-sous-les-Côtes
Cumières-le-Mort-Homme
Damloup
Dieppe-sous-Douaumont
Douaumont-Vaux
Eix
Fleury-devant-Douaumont
Gincrey
Grimaucourt-en-Woëvre
Haumont-près-Samogneux
Louvemont-Côte-du-Poivre
Maucourt-sur-Orne
Mogeville
Moranville
Moulainville
Ornes
Samogneux
Thierville-sur-Meuse
Vacherauville

References

Cantons of Meuse (department)